Jade Boho Sayo (born 30 August 1986), simply known as Jade, is a professional footballer who plays as a forward for Liga F club Alhama CF. Born in Spain to a Spanish father and an Equatorial Guinean mother, she has represented Spain and Equatorial Guinea at under-19 and senior levels, respectively.

Early life
Jade took the surnames of her mother, Lourdes Cristina Boho Sayo, an Equatoguinean emigrant who received Spanish citizenship in August 1980, and, five years later, played Oud Anna in the film Dust, before Jade was born. Her father, whose name is unknown, was Spanish, from Valladolid, where Lourdes was working and living. Jade never met him.

Club career

Spain
Jade previously played for AD Torrejón CF. and Rayo Vallecano, winning three championships and one national cup and playing the UEFA Champions League with the latter.

England

In summer 2015 Jade signed for Bristol Academy who were winless and at the bottom of the FA WSL table. Despite making long journeys for national team duty in Africa, she proved a prolific goalscorer and was hailed as "inspirational" by the team's coach. When Bristol were relegated, Jade left the club to sign for Reading ahead of the 2016 FA WSL season but her stay was short after making the decision to return to Madrid. Her last appearance for the club was on 30 October against Chelsea.

International career

Spain U19 
Jade was born and raised in Spain, but her mother is from Equatorial Guinea, so she was eligible to represent either country. She played in the Spanish team that won the 2004 UEFA Women's Under-19 Championship, scoring the first goal of the final match against Germany.

Equatorial Guinea 
Jade has been a member of the Equatoguinean senior team since 2010. Because Jade competed for Spain in the 2004 FIFA U-19 Women's World Championship, scoring two goals in the second match, she had been registered as a Spanish player in FIFA's database. 

Just days prior to the 2011 FIFA Women's World Cup, FIFA temporarily suspended Jade from both international and club competition for two months, on the grounds that she was playing with Equatorial Guinea while having played with a Spanish national team within the past five years. Since the Equatoguinean Football Federation did not complete the process of changing her FIFA-registered nationality in a timely manner, she was declared ineligible, and Equatorial Guinea were also removed from qualifying for the 2012 Summer Olympics as a result. In September 2011 she announced she would not play for Equatorial Guinea anymore. However, Jade reversed her decision a year later, to go to Malabo for a friendly match against the Democratic Republic of the Congo in June 2012. She then won the African Championship that year.

International goals
Scores and results list Equatorial Guinea's goal tally first

Honours

Club 
Rayo Vallecano
Spanish Championship: 2008–09, 2009–10, 2010–11
Copa de la Reina de Fútbol: 2008

International 
Spain U-19
UEFA Women's Under-19 Championship: 2004
Equatorial Guinea
African Women's Championship: 2012; runner-up: 2010

Personal life
Although born in Valladolid, Jade feels Madrilenian as she has lived in Madrid since she was three months old. She is openly lesbian.

References
Notes

Citations

External links
 
 Jade at FutbolEsta.com 

1986 births
Living people
Spanish people of Bubi descent
Spanish sportspeople of Equatoguinean descent
Citizens of Equatorial Guinea through descent
Equatoguinean sportspeople of Spanish descent
Footballers from Valladolid
Footballers from Madrid
Spanish women's footballers
Equatoguinean women's footballers
AD Torrejón CF Femenino players
Rayo Vallecano Femenino players
Atlético Madrid Femenino players
Bristol Academy W.F.C. players
Reading F.C. Women players
Madrid CFF players
EdF Logroño players
Servette FC Chênois Féminin players
Alhama CF players
Primera División (women) players
Women's Super League players
Spain women's youth international footballers
Equatorial Guinea women's international footballers
Equatoguinean expatriate women's footballers
Spanish expatriate women's footballers
Equatoguinean expatriate sportspeople in England
Spanish expatriate sportspeople in England
Expatriate women's footballers in England
Equatoguinean expatriate sportspeople in Switzerland
Spanish expatriate sportspeople in Switzerland
Expatriate women's footballers in Switzerland
Women's association football forwards
Lesbian sportswomen
LGBT association football players
Spanish lesbians
Spanish LGBT sportspeople
Equatoguinean LGBT people